Milosavljević (Cyrillic script: Милосављевић) is a Serbian patronymic surname derived from a masculine given name Milosav. It may refer to:

Dejana Milosavljević (born 1994), Croatian handball player
Dragan Milosavljević (born 1989), basketball player
Ivan Milosavljević (born 1983), footballer
Marko Milosavljević (born 1985), footballer
Nedeljko Milosavljević (born 1960), footballer
Nenad Milosavljević (born 1954), musician
Predrag Milosavljević (born 1908–1989), painter
Radomir Milosavljević (born 1992), footballer
Ružica Milosavljević (born 1946), chess player
Slobodan Milosavljević (born 1965), economist and politician
Tomica Milosavljević (born 1955), physician and politician
Uroš Milosavljević (born 1982), footballer
Vladislava Milosavljević (born 1955), Serbian actress
Zaviša Milosavljević (born 1961), football manager

Serbian surnames
Patronymic surnames